KKI may refer to:

Khanani and Kalia International (Private) Limited, a former foreign exchange company in Pakistan
Körfuknattleikssamband Íslands (Icelandic Basketball Federation),  the national governing body of basketball in Iceland